LPS may refer to:

Science and medicine
 Lipopolysaccharide (Endotoxin)
 Levator palpebrae superioris muscle

Schools
 Leighton Park School in Reading, England
 Lexington Public Schools, a school district in Massachusetts, USA
 Lincoln Public Schools, a school district in Nebraska, USA
 Livonia Public Schools, a school district in Michigan, USA
 Lucknow Public School in Uttar Pradesh, India
 Luther Preparatory School in Wisconsin, USA

Technology
Leases per second, a speed measure for DHCP servers
 Leica Photogrammetry Suite, software used in building maps
 Lexus Personalized Settings in Lexus cars
  Lightning protection system, a system to protect a structure from damage due to lightning strikes
 Lightweight Portable Security - Linux LiveCD, or LiveUSB that provides a secure end node client
 Linear power supply
 Linux Powered System
 Local positioning system, navigation without GPS
 Low-pressure sodium-vapor lamps

Miscellaneous
 Laajasalon Palloseura, association football club from Helsinki, Finland
 Land and Property Services, an agency of the Northern Ireland Executive
 Lander, Parkin, and Selfridge conjecture, an unproven mathematical statement about equal sums of like powers
 Lanterman–Petris–Short Act
 Large-panel system, the use of prefabricated concrete slabs to construct buildings — see Plattenbau
 Large Polyp Stony corals
 Last Pizza Slice, Slovenian band often called LPS 
 Lender Processing Services in Jacksonville, Florida (in 2014 renamed to Black Knight Financial)
 Liberal Party of Switzerland
 Limit of Positive Stability for boats
 Liters per second
 Littlest Pet Shop, a toy and cartoon series
 Lostprophets an alternative metal band from Pontypridd, Wales, UK
 Long playing records
 Surf (Amtrak station), Lompoc, California, United States; Amtrak station code LPS.
 Levopimaradiene synthase, an enzyme
 Limited Power Source, a class of electrical power source defined by UL and similar organizations.